It is usual for police officers take an oath to uphold the law. The following is a selection from different countries.

Hong Kong 

English version according to Chapter 232, schedule 1, Laws of Hong Kong

I, .. <Officer's Name> .. (swear by Almighty God/ do solemnly and sincerely declare) that I will well and faithfully serve the Government of Hong Kong Special Administrative Region according to law as a police officer, that I will obey uphold and maintain the laws of the Hong Kong Special Administrative Region that I will execute the powers and duties of my office honestly, faithfully and diligently without fear of or favour to any person and with malice or ill-will toward none, and that I will obey without question all lawful orders of those set in authority over me.

Ireland 

English form

Section 16(2) allows the words "before God" to be omitted from the declaration at the request of the declarant.

Irish form

Provision to make the above declaration in Irish is not made within the above Act.  the translated version is not yet available on the Irish Statute Book website.

New Zealand
Section 22 of the Policing Act 2008 prescribes an oath in the following form:-

English form

Māori form

United Kingdom of Great Britain and Northern Ireland

In British legislation, an oath taken by a constable in England and Wales or in Northern Ireland is described as an "attestation" and annotated as such in a relevant Act. In Scotland a constable is required to make a "declaration".

England and Wales

Territorial police constables
The 43 territorial police forces in England and Wales are responsible for general policing. Members of these police forces are attested under section 29 of the Police Act 1996. The prescribed form of words is that given by schedule 4 to the Act (inserted by section 83 of the Police Reform Act 2002), as follows:

English

I (name) ...of (police force)... do solemnly and sincerely declare and affirm that I will well and truly serve the King in the office of constable, with fairness, integrity, diligence and impartiality, upholding fundamental human rights and according equal respect to all people; and that I will, to the best of my power, cause the peace to be kept and preserved and prevent all offences against people and property; and that while I continue to hold the said office I will to the best of my skill and knowledge discharge all the duties thereof faithfully according to law.

Welsh

Park constables
Constables obtaining their powers from the Parks Regulation Act 1872 are required to be "attested as a constable by making a declaration before a justice of the peace that he will duly execute the office of constable" with no specific words prescribed in the Act. The only constables still attested under this Act are those of Kew Constabulary. The Royal Parks Constabulary, whose officers were formerly attested under this Act, was disbanded in 2003.

Constables obtaining their powers from the Ministry of Housing and Local Government Provisional Order Confirmation (Greater London Parks and Open Spaces) Act 1967 are required to be attested in accordance with that Act. These include staff employed to protect parks in individual boroughs in Greater London. Examples include the Wandsworth Parks Police and the Hampstead Heath Constabulary.

Scotland

Constables in Scotland are required to make the declaration given in s.10 of the Police and Fire Reform (Scotland) Act 2012 on appointment. The declaration must be made before a sheriff or justice of the peace.

I, do solemnly, sincerely and truly declare and affirm that I will faithfully discharge the duties of the office of constable with fairness, integrity, diligence and impartiality, and that I will uphold fundamental human rights and accord equal respect to all people, according to law.

Prior to 1 April 2013 constables in Scotland were required to make a declaration on appointment by s.16 of the Police (Scotland) Act 1967 "in such terms as may be prescribed". The words prescribed by the Police (Scotland) Regulations 2004 were as follows:

I hereby do solemnly and sincerely declare and affirm that I will faithfully discharge the duties of the office of constable.

The wording was first given statutory effect under the Police (Scotland) Act 1857 and remained largely similar to that form until replaced by the declaration required by the Police and Fire Reform (Scotland) Act 2012.

Northern Ireland
Police officers of the Police Service of Northern Ireland are attested under section 38 of the Police (Northern Ireland) Act 2000. The terms are prescribed by that section, and are as follows:

I hereby do solemnly and sincerely and truly declare and affirm that I will faithfully discharge the duties of the office of constable, with fairness, integrity, diligence and impartiality, upholding fundamental human rights and according equal respect to all individuals and their traditions and beliefs; and that while I continue to hold the said office I will to the best of my skill and knowledge discharge all the duties thereof according to law.

Other constables
Constables and special constables of the British Transport Police are required by sections 24 and 25 of the Railways and Transport Safety Act 2003 to make different attestations/declarations depending on where they are appointed. In England and Wales, BTP constables take the same oath as prescribed by the Police Act 1996 for a territorial police constable, and in Scotland make the same declaration that as prescribed under the Police (Scotland) Regulations 2004 for a territorial police constable. The location of the declaration/attestation, and the words used, make no difference to the extent of the constable's jurisdiction.

Members of the Ministry of Defence Police are required—as with BTP constables—to take the oath that a territorial police constable would in the country in which they are attested. The same applies to members of the Civil Nuclear Constabulary, though in Scotland they are required to only make a "declaration faithfully to execute the duties of the office of a member of the Civil Nuclear Constabulary".

Civilian security officers belonging to the Northern Ireland Security Guard Service are attested by a resident magistrate as a special constable whilst on duty within Ministry of Defence property.

References

Law enforcement in the United Kingdom
Hong Kong Police Force
Law enforcement in Scotland
Law of New Zealand
Oaths
Police culture